William More (by 1508 – will proved 1549) was an English politician.

He was a Member (MP) of the Parliament of England for Shaftesbury in 1529 and 1545.

References

1549 deaths
English MPs 1529–1536
Year of birth uncertain
English MPs 1545–1547